Forest-in-Teesdale is a village in County Durham, England. It is situated in upper Teesdale, on the north side of the Tees between Newbiggin and Langdon Beck.

References

External links

Villages in County Durham